The three teams in this group played against each other on a home-and-away basis. The winner West Germany qualified for the eighth FIFA World Cup held in England.

Matches

 

 

 

 

 

West Germany qualified.

Final Table

Team stats

Head coach:  Helmut Schön

Head coach:  Lennart Nyman

Head coach:  Argyrios Gavalas

External links
FIFA official page
RSSSF - 1966 World Cup Qualification
Allworldcup

2
1964–65 in German football
Qual
1964 in Swedish football
1965 in Swedish football
1964–65 in Cypriot football